Patrick Peter Evans (born 25 August 1981) is an English former first-class cricketer.

Evans was born at Hammersmith in October 1965. He later studied at Keble College, Oxford where he played first-class cricket for Oxford University. He made two first-class appearances for Oxford, playing in The University Matches of 2002 and 2003 against Cambridge University. Playing as a wicket-keeper, he scored 30 runs with a high score of 16.

References

External links

1981 births
Living people
People from Hammersmith
Alumni of Keble College, Oxford
English cricketers
Oxford University cricketers